Christine Downey (born March 26, 1949) is a former American politician who served as a Democrat in the Kansas State Senate from 1993 to 2004.

Downey was born in Abilene, Kansas and attended Wichita State University, where she received both bachelor's and master's degrees in education. She worked as a teacher at several different levels of education before entering the State Senate.

When Norma Daniels retired from the Kansas Senate, Downey was recruited to run for office by Charles Benjamin, a county commissioner. She spent three terms in the Kansas Senate, where she worked on legislation regulating pollution from concentrated animal feeding operations (CAFOs), as well as bills that would consolidate and reform Kansas's public university system. She declined to run for re-election in 2004, and was succeeded by Carolyn McGinn.

After leaving the Senate, Downey was appointed to the Kansas Board of Regents by Governor Kathleen Sebelius in 2005, and served there until 2013.

References

1949 births
Living people
Democratic Party Kansas state senators
Kansas Board of Regents
20th-century American politicians
20th-century American women politicians
21st-century American politicians
21st-century American women politicians
Women state legislators in Kansas
Wichita State University alumni
People from Newton, Kansas
People from McPherson County, Kansas
People from Abilene, Kansas